The Molecular Modeling Database (MMDB) is a database of experimentally determined three-dimensional biomolecular structures and hosted by the  National Center for Biotechnology Information.

See also
 Protein structure

References

External links
 https://www.ncbi.nlm.nih.gov/structure

Biological databases
National Institutes of Health
Protein structure